The Muzooka Radio Chart is a weekly Top 500 radio chart.

History 
Muzooka began as a streaming site in the early 2010s before the organization launched its Top 500 radio chart. The Top 500 radio chart was launched in February 2017. After the dissolution of CMJ in 2017, Muzooka has become one of the primary sources for the publication of college radio airplay. In 2019, iHeartRadio added Muzooka to its chart reporting.

Charts 
Muzooka publishes both a weighted and an unweighted radio chart.

References

External links 

 Official radio chart
Radio_in_North_America
Radio_websites
Radio_organizations
Record_charts